¡Qué familia tan cotorra! is a 1973 Mexican comedy film directed by Fernando Cortés. It is the sequel to the film, Los Beverly de Peralvillo (1971).

Synopsis
As Borras and Pecas get ready for their new child, the Beverlys come into the new family's home.

Cast
Guillermo Rivas as "El Borras"
Leonorilda Ochoa as "La Pecas"
Arturo Castro as "Bigotón"
Amparo Arozamena as Doña Chole "La Tarantula"

External links

Mexican comedy films
1973 films
1970s Mexican films